Harry Hills (28 September 1886, date of death unknown) was an English cricketer. He played for Essex between 1912 and 1919.

References

External links

1886 births
Year of death missing
English cricketers
Essex cricketers
People from Maldon District